Thomas Garfield "Gar" Knutson,  (born May 4, 1956) is a lawyer and former member of the Parliament of Canada, as well as a former Cabinet Minister in the Government of Canada.

Gar Knutson holds a Master of Business Administration (MBA) degree from the Richard Ivey School of Business at the University of Western Ontario, as well as a B.A. in History.  Following University, Gar graduated with a Bachelor of Laws (LL.B) degree from the University of Windsor. He attended high school at the Jesuit Brebeuf College School in Toronto.

In the 1993 federal election, he was elected to the House of Commons of Canada as the Member of Parliament (MP) for Elgin—Norfolk riding as a candidate representing the Liberal Party. He was re-elected in the 1997 and 2000 elections to the re-organized riding of Elgin—Middlesex—London.

He served as Parliamentary Secretary to Prime Minister Jean Chrétien from 2000 to 2002. In 2002, he was named Secretary of State for Central and Eastern Europe and the Middle East, and served as Minister of State for International Trade from 2003 to 2004 under Prime Minister Paul Martin. Gar was defeated by the Elgin-Middlesex-London Conservative candidate Joe Preston in the 2004 election. Shortly afterwards, Knutson joined Borden Ladner Gervais LLP, Canada's largest law firm, practicing in the area of government relations and public policy. Knutson spent 13 years at Borden Ladner Gervais LLP, from 2005 to 2018, leaving to start his own boutique law firm, Knutson Law.

Knutson attempted to stage a political comeback in the 2007 Federal Liberal nomination in the riding of Ottawa—Orléans, but lost to former MP Marc Godbout.

External links
 

1956 births
Living people
Lawyers in Ontario
Liberal Party of Canada MPs
Members of the House of Commons of Canada from Ontario
Members of the King's Privy Council for Canada
Politicians from Toronto
University of Western Ontario alumni
University of Windsor alumni
Members of the 26th Canadian Ministry
Members of the 27th Canadian Ministry
University of Windsor Faculty of Law alumni